Mickaël Mathieu Latour (born 16 September 1995) is a French professional footballer who plays as a winger for Championnat National 2 club US Lusitanos.

Club career
Latour represented Paris Saint-Germain as a youth before joining Serie B club Virtus Entella on 28 July 2014. He made his debut for the club on 16 August, playing the entire second half in a 2–2 Coppa Italia home draw against Benevento.

Latour made his debut in the second division on 8 November 2014, coming on as a late substitute for Francesco Belli in a 1–2 away loss against Perugia. He only appeared in four matches for Virtus, all from the bench, and was subsequently released in the end of the season.

On 1 February 2016, Latour signed an 18-month contract with RCD Espanyol, being assigned to the reserves in Segunda División B.

References

External links

Mickaël Latour at Footballdatabase
FFF Profile

1995 births
Living people
People from Rueil-Malmaison
French footballers
Association football wingers
Ligue 2 players
Serie B players
Virtus Entella players
Segunda División B players
Championnat National 2 players
RCD Espanyol B footballers
US Lusitanos Saint-Maur players
FC Chambly Oise players
French expatriate footballers
French expatriate sportspeople in Italy
French expatriate sportspeople in Spain
Expatriate footballers in Italy
Expatriate footballers in Spain